German submarine U-135 was a Type VIIC U-boat of Nazi Germany's Kriegsmarine during World War II.

She was laid down at the Vulkan-Vegesackerwerft in Bremen on 16 September 1940 as yard number 14, launched on 12 June 1941 and commissioned on 16 August with Oberleutnant zur See Friederich-Hermann Praetorius in command.

U-135 began her service career in training with the 5th U-boat Flotilla, before moving on to the 7th flotilla for operations.

Design
German Type VIIC submarines were preceded by the shorter Type VIIB submarines. U-135 had a displacement of  when at the surface and  while submerged. She had two shafts and two  propellers.

U-135 was fitted with five  torpedo tubes (four fitted at the bow and one at the stern), fourteen torpedoes, one  SK C/35 naval gun, 220 rounds, and a  C/30 anti-aircraft gun. The boat had a complement of between forty-four and sixty.

Service history

First and second patrols
The submarine's first patrol began with her departure from Kiel on 24 December 1941. Her route took her across the North Sea and into the Atlantic Ocean via the passage between the Orkney and Shetland Islands. She arrived at St. Nazaire in occupied France on the 31st.

Her second foray was northeast of Iceland, but she returned to another port, Brest, on 3 April 1942.

Third and fourth patrols
Her third sortie was her longest, at 71 days. Having departed Brest on 26 April 1942, she sank Fort Qu Appelle on 17 May north of Bermuda. She also sank Pleasantville on 8 June northwest of Bermuda before returning to St. Nazaire on 5 June.

The boat was later attacked by a Czech-crewed Vickers Wellington aircraft of No. 311 Squadron RAF on 3 October 1942 in the Bay of Biscay. Only minor damage was sustained, but one man was killed and another died of his wounds.

Fifth and sixth patrols
Her fifth sortie took her across the Atlantic, almost to the coast of Newfoundland.

U-135s sixth patrol was toward Greenland; she was attacked by a British B-24 Liberator of 120 Squadron northeast of Ireland on 8 February 1943. Some damage was repaired, but the boat was forced to return to Lorient on 10 March when further leaks were discovered.

Seventh patrol and loss

For her last patrol, she left Lorient on 7 June 1943. Northeast of the West Indies, she attacked and damaged Twickenham on the 15th. U-135 was sunk east of the Canary Islands on 15 July. Five men died, there were 41 survivors.

Wolfpacks
U-135 took part in ten wolfpacks, namely:
 Zieten (6 – 20 January 1942) 
 Westwall (2 – 12 March 1942) 
 York (12 – 25 March 1942) 
 Pfadfinder (21 – 27 May 1942) 
 Lohs (17 August - 20 September 1942) 
 Panzer (23 November - 11 December 1942) 
 Raufbold (11 – 19 December 1942) 
 Pfeil (3 – 8 February 1943) 
 Neptun (18 – 28 February 1943) 
 Trutz 2 (22 – 29 June 1943)

Summary of raiding history

References

Bibliography

External links

German Type VIIC submarines
U-boats commissioned in 1941
U-boats sunk in 1943
World War II submarines of Germany
1941 ships
World War II shipwrecks in the Atlantic Ocean
Ships built in Bremen (state)
U-boats sunk by US aircraft
U-boats sunk by depth charges
U-boats sunk by British warships
Maritime incidents in July 1943